Bacillus horti is a species of Gram-negative alkaliphilic bacillus. Its cells are strictly aerobic rods that produce subterminally located ellipsoidal spores. Its type strain is  K13T (= JCM 9943T).

References

Further reading
Berkeley, Roger, et al., eds. Applications and systematics of bacillus and relatives. John Wiley & Sons, 2008.
Logan, Niall A., and Paul De Vos. "Bacillus." Bergey's manual of systematic bacteriology 3 (2009): 21–128.
Mielenz, Jonathan R., et al. Biotechnology for Fuels and Chemicals: The Twenty-Eighth Symposium. Vol. 136. Springer, 2009.
Ivanova, Elena P., et al. "Characterization of Bacillus strains of marine origin."International microbiology 2.4 (2010): 267–271.

External links

LPSN
Type strain of Bacillus horti at BacDive -  the Bacterial Diversity Metadatabase

horti
Bacteria described in 1998